Bingara Shire was a local government area located in the New England region of New South Wales, Australia, about  north of Tamworth via Fossickers Way.

History
In early 1889, following a petition from residents, the Bingara Municipality was incorporated to serve the town, which then had a population of about 750, and John Byrnes was elected its first mayor. With the passage of the Local Government Act 1906, which established shires all over New South Wales, the Gwydir Shire was gazetted to serve the surrounding district on 6 March 1906, and Byrnes was elected its first president.

On 17 December 1943, the Bingara Municipality and Gwydir Shire were amalgamated by proclamation into the new Bingara Shire, despite protests from both councils.

On 17 March 2004, Bingera Shire was abolished and merged with the Yallaroi Shire and part of Barraba to form a new Gwydir Shire.

Towns
 Bingara
 Bangheet
 Caroda
 Dinoga
 Elcombe
 Gineroi
 Keera
 Myall Creek
 Pallal
 Riverview
 Upper Bingara

Population

References

Former local government areas of New South Wales
New England (New South Wales)
1944 establishments in Australia
2004 disestablishments in Australia